General Stephen Alexander Melville,  (31 December 1904 – 17 June 1977) was a South African Air Force officer. He commanded air force formations in East Africa, North Africa, Madagascar, and Italy during the Second World War, and rose to Air Chief of Staff (1954–56) and Commandant General of the South African Defence Force (1958–60).

Early life
Melville was born in Matatiele, Natal, on 31 December 1904, and was educated at Grey College, Bloemfontein. He then worked in a bank, and later joined the Merchant Navy as a stoker. He joined the South African Mounted Rifles in 1924 as a trooper before transferring to the Artillery. In 1929, after a short boxing career in South Africa and the United States, Melville was trained as a pilot and transferred to the South African Air Force.

Air Force career
Melville commanded air force formations in the East African Campaign, Battle of Madagascar and Italian Campaign during the Second World War. For his service, Melville was appointed an Officer of the Order of the British Empire, and Mentioned in Despatches in July 1943.

Melville served as Air Chief of Staff from 1954 to 1956, as Inspector-General from 1956 to 1958, and as Commandant General, the head of the Union Defence Force, from 1958 to 1960. He was awarded the Star of South Africa in June 1960.

Melville later served on the Armaments Board until 1974. He was also the Government's representative on the Rand Water Board.

References

|-

|-

1904 births
1977 deaths
People from Pretoria
South African people of British descent
White South African people
South African Air Force personnel
Officers of the Order of the British Empire
Chiefs of the South African Air Force
South African military personnel of World War II